Alfred Duranleau,  (November 1, 1871 – March 11, 1951) was a Canadian lawyer, politician, and judge.

Born in Farnham, Quebec, the son of Napoléon Duranleau and Adélaïde Patenaude, he was educated as a lawyer and was called to the Quebec Bar in 1897.

In 1923, he was elected to the Legislative Assembly of Quebec for the riding of Montréal-Laurier. A Conservative, he was defeated in 1927.

He was elected to the House of Commons of Canada for the riding of Chambly-Verchères in the 1930 federal election. A Conservative, he was the Minister of Marine from 1930 to 1935 and the Minister of Fisheries (Acting) from 1932 to 1934. From 1935 until his death in 1951, he was a judge on the Superior Court of Quebec. He was entombed at the Notre Dame des Neiges Cemetery in Montreal.

References

 
 

1871 births
1951 deaths
Conservative Party of Canada (1867–1942) MPs
Members of the House of Commons of Canada from Quebec
Members of the King's Privy Council for Canada
Conservative Party of Quebec MNAs
Judges in Quebec
Lawyers in Quebec
People from Montérégie
Burials at Notre Dame des Neiges Cemetery